Asura hilaris is a moth of the  family Erebidae. It is found in Sri Lanka and on Java.

References

hilaris
Moths described in 1854
Moths of Asia